The 2007 UEFA Cup Final was a football match that took place on 16 May 2007 at Hampden Park in Glasgow, Scotland.

In an all-Spanish final, Sevilla defeated Espanyol 3–1 on penalties after drawing 2–2 after extra-time, becoming the first club to win the Cup two years in succession since the mid-1980s (Real Madrid won the competition in 1985 and 1986).

Sevilla also won the 2006–07 Copa del Rey a month later.

Route to the final

Match

Details

Statistics

Source: UEFA Full Time Report

See also

2006–07 UEFA Cup
2007 UEFA Champions League Final
2007 UEFA Super Cup
RCD Espanyol in European football
Sevilla FC in European football
Spanish football clubs in international competitions

References

External links
2006–07 season at UEFA.com

2007
UEFA Cup Final 2007
UEFA Cup Final 2007
UEFA Cup Final 2007
UEFA Cup Finals
2006–07 in Scottish football
UEFA Cup Final 2007
Final
UEFA
May 2007 sports events in the United Kingdom
2000s in Glasgow
Football in Glasgow